Sada Thioub (born 1 June 1995) is a professional footballer who plays as a winger for  club Angers. Born in France, he plays for the Senegal national team.

Club career
Thioub is a youth exponent from Nice. He made his Ligue 1 debut for the club on 23 January 2015 against Marseille, replacing Niklas Hult after 89 minutes in a 2–1 home win.

On 6 January 2022, Thioub signed for Saint-Étienne on loan until the end of the 2021–22 season.

International career
On 27 February 2019, Thioub was called up to the Senegal national team. He was one of four young Senegalese players to receive a debut call-up to the national team. He made his debut on 23 March 2019 in an Africa Cup of Nations qualifier against Madagascar, as an 86th-minute substitute for Ismaïla Sarr.

Personal life
Born in France, Thioub is of Senegalese descent.

Career statistics

International

References

1995 births
Living people
People from Nanterre
French sportspeople of Senegalese descent
Black French sportspeople
Citizens of Senegal through descent
Senegalese footballers
French footballers
Footballers from Hauts-de-Seine
Association football midfielders
Senegal international footballers
2019 Africa Cup of Nations players
Ligue 1 players
Ligue 2 players
Championnat National players
Championnat National 2 players
Championnat National 3 players
OGC Nice players
En Avant Guingamp players
CA Bastia players
Nîmes Olympique players
Angers SCO players
AS Saint-Étienne players